This is a list of the government ministries of Rivers State, Nigeria. Each ministry is headed by a Commissioner who in most cases is assisted by a Permanent Secretary. The Commissioner is responsible for policy, while the Permanent Secretary provides continuity and is responsible for operations.

List of ministries and their commissioners

See also
Government of Rivers State

References

Government of Rivers State
 
Ministries
Lists of government ministries